USS LST-1017 was a  in the United States Navy during World War II. She was transferred to the Republic of China Navy as ROCS Chung Chi (LST-206).

Construction and commissioning 
LST-1017 was laid down on 25 March 1944 at Bethlehem Steel Company, Quincy, Massachusetts. Launched on 25 April 1944 and commissioned on 12 May 1944.

Service in United States Navy 

During World War II, LST-1017 was assigned to the Asiatic-Pacific theater. She then participated in the Morotai landings on 15 September 1944 and Leyte landings from 5 to 18 November 1944. In 1945, she took part in the Lingayen Gulf landing from 4 to 17 January, the Mindanao Island landing from 17 to 23 April, Transporting Australian Troops ex Cairns (Queensland) on 27 May, disembarked Morotai 13 June 1945 and Balikpapan operation from 26 June to 9 July. She was assigned to occupation and China from 20 October 1945 to 29 June 1946.

She was decommissioned on 29 June 1946 and struck from the Naval Register, 12 March 1948 after she was transferred to the Republic of China on 14 December 1946.

Service in Republic of China Navy 
Chung Chi was decommissioned on 1 September 1990.

Awards 
LST-1017 have earned the following awards:

China Service Medal (extended) 
American Campaign Medal 
Asiatic-Pacific Campaign Medal (5 battle stars)
World War II Victory Medal
Navy Occupation Service Medal (with Asia clasp) 
Philippines Presidential Unit Citation 
Philippines Liberation Medal (2 battle stars)

Citations

Sources 
 
 
 
 

LST-542-class tank landing ships
Ships built in Quincy, Massachusetts
World War II amphibious warfare vessels of the United States
LST-542-class tank landing ships of the Republic of China Navy
1944 ships